Bosnia and Herzegovina competed at the 2006 Winter Olympics in Turin, Italy.

Alpine skiing

Biathlon

Cross-country skiing 

Distance

References

Nations at the 2006 Winter Olympics
2006
Winter Olympics